The Ministry of Energy of the Russian Federation is, since 2008, the Russian federal ministry responsible for energy policy.

This ministry was created in May 2008 as part of a reorganization by the incoming government of President Dmitry Medvedev. It is headquartered in Moscow. The former Ministry of Industry and Energy was turned into the Ministry of Industry, whose present Minister is Viktor Khristenko, gaining responsibility for trade policy from the former Ministry of Economic Development and Trade, but losing responsibility for energy policy, which was split off into the new Ministry of Energy. The former Federal Agency for Energy (Rosenergo) was also merged into the new Ministry of Energy.

Ministers

References

External links 

 Official Site 

Energy
Energy, Ministry of

Energy, Ministry of